Makpele is a chiefdom in Pujehun District of Sierra Leone with a population of 21,955. Its principal town is Zimmi.

References

Chiefdoms of Sierra Leone
Southern Province, Sierra Leone